Wu Tzu-hsin is a Taiwanese politician. He has served as the

Education
Wu obtained his bachelor's and master's degrees in public finance from National Chengchi University.

Political career
Wu was appointed as the Administrative Deputy Minister of Finance since 20 May 2016 until May 2020.

References

Living people
Political office-holders in the Republic of China on Taiwan
Year of birth missing (living people)